"How Does It Feel" is song by the British rock band Slade, released in 1975 as the second single from the band's first soundtrack album and fifth studio album Slade in Flame, in promotion of the film of the same name. The song was written by lead vocalist Noddy Holder and bassist Jim Lea, and produced by Chas Chandler. It reached No. 15 in the UK, remaining in the charts for seven weeks.

Background
By 1974, Slade had become a big success in the UK, Europe and beyond; however the band felt that continuing to provide 'more of the same' was not what they wanted to do. Their manager Chas Chandler suggested they do a movie, to which the band agreed. To accompany the film, Holder and Lea began writing material for a soundtrack album, which would continue to see the band break out of their successful formula and try different musical ideas. In late 1974, the lead single "Far Far Away" had reached No. 2, while Slade in Flame peaked at No. 6. Following the film's release in January 1975, it was decided to release "How Does It Feel" as the second single the following month. It reached No. 15, which was the band's first single not to reach the UK Top 5 since their 1971 breakthrough with "Get Down and Get with It".

The melody of "How Does It Feel" was the first Lea had ever written, while he was still in school. He came up with the idea on an old piano which he later described as having half the keys missing. Although the tune never developed any further at that time, Lea later revisited it for use as the theme tune for Flame. Holder wrote the song's lyrics and it became "How Does It Feel". The song featured a brass section, performed by members of Gonzalez. In the band's 1984 biography Feel the Noize!, Lea recalled: "It was an old song that I'd written and Nod put some great lyrics to it. Tommy Vance said that it was good but that we were in for a hard time. But it didn't matter to me whether it was number one or number 15... to me it was a much better record than we'd made before and that was all I cared about."

Despite the song's disappointing charting, "How Does It Feel" is now widely considered as one of the band's finest songs. In 1999, Noel Gallagher of Oasis said the song was "one of the best songs written, in the history of pop, ever". In a 1986 fan club interview, guitarist Dave Hill spoke of the song: "It was totally different to anything we had ever done before, but you see we were capable of that sort of thing, though our manager/producer Chas Chandler used to keep us clear from that. Trying to be too clever was considered at the time to be going in another direction."

Release
"How Does It Feel" was released on 7" vinyl by Polydor Records in the UK, Ireland, across Europe, Scandinavia, Yugoslavia, Australia and Japan. In America, it was released by Warner Bros. Records in September 1975. The B-side on the Polydor releases of the single was the Slade in Flame album track "So Far So Good". In America, "O.K. Yesterday Was Yesterday" featured as the B-side, also taken from Slade in Flame. In the UK, the first 200,000 copies of the single featured a colour sleeve.

Promotion
No music video was created to promote the single. In the UK, the band performed the song on the music show Top of the Pops, The Russell Harty Show and the children's show Crackerjack. The band also performed the song on the Dutch AVRO TV show TopPop.

Critical reception
Upon release, Record Mirror noted the song was "very different" from Slade's usual sound, with "far less reliance on guitars and far more on an orchestral arrangement". Disc said the song was one of Slade's best, commented: "Starting quietly it builds up, simmers down, flares up and so on". American magazine Cash Box listed the single as one of their "picks of the week" during August 1975. They described the song as an "effective, almost ballad-like, single" with "effective vocals and tight licks".

In a review of the Slade in Flame album, Record Mirror said: ""How Does It Feel" has a slower relaxed beat with grasping dramatic vocals delivered with as much feeling as Sir Larry's "Richard III"." Disc said: "For once Noddy's voice is allowed to take almost total precedence and the result is a poignant and unusual number." In a retrospective review of the album, Geoff Ginsberg of AllMusic commented: "From the opening number, "How Does It Feel," Slade sets a different tone".

Formats
7" single
"How Does It Feel" - 4:46
"So Far So Good" - 2:59

7" single (US release)
"How Does It Feel" - 3:15
"O.K. Yesterday Was Yesterday" - 3:58

7" single (US promo)
"How Does It Feel" - 3:15
"How Does It Feel" - 3:15

Chart performance

Cover versions
 In 2001, English rock vocalist Chris Farlowe recorded a version of the track for the tribute album Slade Remade.
 In 2006, English rock group Def Leppard released their own version of the song as an iTunes exclusive bonus track for their album Yeah!.
In 2016, English singer-songwriter James Blunt performed a version of the song as part of his set at the opening ceremony of the 2016 Invictus Games in Orlando, Florida.
In 2017, British singer Joanna Forest released her own version of the song on her debut album Stars Are Rising. It was released as the album's first single.

Personnel
Slade
Noddy Holder - lead vocals, guitar
Dave Hill - lead guitar, backing vocals
Jim Lea - bass, piano, organ, flute, backing vocals
Don Powell - drums

Additional personnel
Members of Gonzalez - brass section
Chas Chandler - producer

References

1975 singles
1975 songs
Slade songs
Songs written by Noddy Holder
Songs written by Jim Lea
Song recordings produced by Chas Chandler
Polydor Records singles